CardEx was international phone card event and expo. For this event many special CardEx phone cards were produced in many countries.

It existed and was held in:
CardEx 94 (Amsterdam, The Netherlands - September 8–11, 1994)
CardEx 95 (Maastricht, The Netherlands - September 13–17, 1995)
CardEx 96 (Maastricht, The Netherlands - October 9–13, 1996)
CardEx 97 (Brussels, Belgium - October 24–26, 1997)
CardEx 98 (Brussels, Belgium - November 19–21, 1998)

The bankruptcy of Cardex was announced a month before Cardex 98.

References 

Telecommunications economics